Warren Hugo Paul Schmakel (November 3, 1920 – November 17, 1982) was an American football player, coach, scout, and college athletics administrator.  He served as the head football coach at Central Michigan University in 1950 and at Boston University from 1964 to 1968, compiling a career college football record of 26-28-2.  Schmakel later served as the athletic director at Boston University and at Illinois State University, and as a scout for the San Francisco 49ers of the National Football League (NFL).

Coaching career
While head coach at Boston University, Schmakel coached 20 players who were either drafted or received professional tryouts. This group included Bruce Taylor, the 1970 NFL Rookie of The Year (playing for the San Francisco 49ers), Reggie Rucker, Pat Hughes, and Dick Farley, who played for the San Diego Chargers and went on to a Hall of Fame coaching career at Williams College.

Death
Schmakel died on November 17, 1982 in at Lincoln General Hospital in Lincoln, Nebraska.

Head coaching record

References

External links
 

1920 births
1982 deaths
Boston University Terriers athletic directors
Boston University Terriers football coaches
Central Michigan Chippewas football coaches
Central Michigan Chippewas football players
Illinois State Redbirds athletic directors
Miami RedHawks football coaches
Nebraska Cornhuskers football coaches
Rutgers Scarlet Knights football coaches
Toledo Rockets football coaches
Sportspeople from Toledo, Ohio